Vangelis Kyriacou (Greek: Βαγγέλης Κυριάκου; born 13 February 1994) is a Cypriot footballer who plays as a right-back for the Cypriot club Olympiakos Nicosia and the Cyprus national team.

Club career
Kyriacou began his youth career at Olympiakos Nicosia and moved for his professional career to Othellos Athienou debuting in a 2–1 Cypriot First Division loss to APOEL on 6 October 2014. As per an interview at FIFPRO, he has indicated that his first salary was 3,000 euro per year.  He then moved to Aris Limassol in 2015. After a couple of seasons as a starter with Aris, he moved to ENP where he helped the team win the 2017–18 Cypriot Second Division and get promoted. He then had a stint with Anagennisi Deryneia, before transferring to Olympiakos Nicosia his boyhood club in the First Division on 9 July 2019. He was appointed the captain of Olympiakos Nicosia in 2021.

International career
He debuted with the Cyprus national team in a 2–0 2020–21 UEFA Nations League win over Estonia on 29 March 2022.

Honours
ENP
 Cypriot Second Division: 2017-18

References

External links
 
 

1994 births
Living people
Sportspeople from Nicosia
Cypriot footballers
Cyprus international footballers
Association football fullbacks
Othellos Athienou F.C. players
Aris Limassol FC players
Enosis Neon Paralimni FC players
Anagennisi Deryneia FC players
Olympiakos Nicosia players
Cypriot First Division players
Cypriot Second Division players